Year 1399 (MCCCXCIX) was a common year starting on Wednesday (link will display the full calendar) of the Julian calendar.

Events

January–December 
 January – Timur the Lame captures and sacks Haridwar.
 February 3 – John of Gaunt, uncle of King Richard II of England and father of Henry Bolingbroke, dies.
 March 18 – Richard II of England cancels the legal documents allowing the exiled Henry Bolingbroke to inherit his father's lands.
 July 4 – While Richard II of England is away on a military campaign in Ireland, Henry Bolingbroke, with exiled former archbishop of Canterbury Thomas Arundel as an advisor, returns to England and begins a military campaign to reclaim his confiscated lands.
 August 6 – Prince of Yan (Zhu Di) of China starts a rebellion in Beijing.
 August 12 – Battle of the Vorskla River: Mongol Golden Horde forces, led by Khan Temür Qutlugh and Emir Edigu, annihilate a crusading army led by former Golden Horde Khan Tokhtamysh, and Grand Duke Vytautas of Lithuania.
 August 19 – Richard II of England is taken prisoner upon his return from Ireland.
 September 29 – Having regained his father's lands, Henry Bolingbroke is urged to take the crown from the unpopular Richard II of England. Parliament charges Richard II with committing crimes against his subjects and eventually forces him to abdicate.
 September 30 – Parliament accepts Henry Bolingbroke as the new king of England.
 October 13 – Henry IV of England is crowned.
 October 19 – Thomas Arundel is restored as Archbishop of Canterbury, replacing Roger Walden.
 November 1 – John V, Duke of Brittany begins his reign.

Date unknown 
 Faraj succeeds his father, Barquq, as Mamluk Sultan of Egypt.
 Sultan Bayezid I of the Ottoman Empire invades Mamluk-occupied Syria. A rift forms between Sultan Bayezid and Timur of the Timurid Empire, who also wanted to conquer Syria.
 Ladislaus regains the throne of Naples, after overthrowing King Louis II.
 King Jogaila becomes sole ruler of Poland, after the death of his co-ruling wife, Queen Jadwiga.
 Abu Said Uthman III succeeds Abdullah, as ruler of the Marinid dynasty in present-day Morocco.
 The Principality of Achaea (now southern Greece) resists an invasion by the Ottoman Empire.
 Traditional foundation date of the Kingdom of Mysore in India, which survives until 1950.
 Iuga becomes prince of Moldavia

Births 
 March 16 – Xuande Emperor of China (d. 1435)
 June 26 – John, Count of Angoulême (d. 1467)
 date unknown
 William II Canynges, English merchant (approximate date; d. 1474)
 Zara Yaqob, Emperor of Ethiopia (d. 1468)
 Rogier van der Weyden, Dutch painter (or 1400)

Deaths 

 January 4 – Nicholas Eymerich, Catalan theologian and inquisitor
 February 3 – John of Gaunt, 1st Duke of Lancaster (b. 1340)
 March 24 – Margaret, Duchess of Norfolk (b. c. 1320)
 July 13 – Peter Parler, German architect (b. 1330)
 July 17 – Queen Jadwiga of Poland (b. 1374)
 August 12 – Demetrius I Starshy, Prince of Trubczewsk (in battle) (b. 1327)
 August 15 – Ide Pedersdatter Falk, Danish noblewoman (b. 1358)
 August 26 – Mikhail II, Grand Prince of Tver (b. 1333)
 September 22 – Thomas de Mowbray, 1st Duke of Norfolk, English politician (b. 1366)
 October 3 – Eleanor de Bohun, English noble (b. c.1366)
 October 5 – Raymond of Capua, Italian Dominic friar and venerated Christian (b. 1330)
 November 1 – John IV, Duke of Brittany (b. 1339)
 date unknown
 Spytek z Melsztyna, Polish nobleman
 William le Scrope, 1st Earl of Wiltshire (b. 1350)
 Sultan Barquq of Egypt
 Trần Ngung, former ruler of Trần dynasty Vietnam (forced to commit suicide)
 Stephen I of Moldavia

References